Reunion Blues is a 1971 album by Oscar Peterson and Milt Jackson.

Track listing
 "(I Can't Get No) Satisfaction" (Mick Jagger, Keith Richards) – 4:04
 "Dream of You" (Benny Carter, Irving Mills) – 4:17
 "Some Day My Prince Will Come" (Frank Churchill, Larry Morey) – 6:11
 "A Time for Love" (Johnny Mandel, Paul Francis Webster) – 5:28
 "Reunion Blues" (Milt Jackson) – 6:39
 "When I Fall in Love" (Edward Heyman, Victor Young) – 5:14
 "Red Top" (Lionel Hampton, Ben Kynard) – 8:45

Personnel

Performance
 Oscar Peterson – piano
 Milt Jackson – vibraphone
 Ray Brown – double bass
 Louis Hayes - drums

References 

1971 albums
Oscar Peterson albums
Milt Jackson albums
MPS Records albums